Marbury School may refer to:
 Marbury High School, Alabama
 Marbury School, Aldgate in the Adelaide Hills, South Australia